Nicolás Andrés Caprio (born May 26, 1989 in Santa Fe, Argentina) is an Argentine footballer currently playing for San Jorge de Tucumán of the Torneo Argentino A.

Teams
  Unión de Santa Fe (2007–2011)
  Libertad de Sunchales (2011–2012)
  Unión de Santa Fe (2012–2013)
  San Jorge de Tucumán (2013–2014)
  Unión Aconquija 2014
  Cipolletti (2015-2021)
  → Deportivo Petapa (loan) (2016-2017)
  → Ferro Carril Oeste (loan) (2017-2018)
  → Sarmiento (loan) (2019-2020)
  Monagas S.C. (2021-2022)

Honors
Monagas S.C.
 Venezuelan Primera División: Runners-up - 2022

References
 
 
 Profile at Unión de Santa Fe

1989 births
Living people
Argentine footballers
Unión de Santa Fe footballers
Libertad de Sunchales footballers
Argentine Primera División players
Association footballers not categorized by position
Footballers from Santa Fe, Argentina